Benjamin Alfred Stanley (born March 12, 1998) is an American college basketball player for the Old Dominion Monarchs of the Sun Belt Conference. He previously played for the Hampton Pirates and Xavier Musketeers.

Early life and high school career
Stanley was born in Syracuse, New York and moved with his family to Baltimore, Maryland while in fifth grade. He played basketball for Our Lady of Mount Carmel School in Essex, Maryland for two years and Baltimore City College for one year. After reclassifying to the 2017 class, Stanley transferred to Millwood School in Midlothian, Virginia. In his senior season, he averaged 15 points, eight rebounds and three assists per game. Stanley competed for Maryland 3D and Team Loaded on the Amateur Athletic Union circuit. He chose to play college basketball for Hampton over scholarship offers from Longwood, Maryland Eastern Shore and Wagner, among others.

College career

Hampton
Stanley was forced to redshirt his first season at Hampton because of transcript issues. During his redshirt year, he became more comfortable handling the ball with his right hand. Stanley came off the bench in his freshman season, averaging 4.4 points and 2.9 rebounds per game. He became a regular starter as a sophomore and was placed in a leading role after Jermaine Marrow was sidelined with a broken hand in November 2019. On December 5, Stanley scored a career-high 40 points and grabbed 11 rebounds in a 94–91 overtime loss to Howard. On December 28, he recorded 33 points, six rebounds, five blocks and three assists in a 70–67 win over Saint Peter's. Stanley and Jermaine Marrow were labeled the "best scoring duo in college basketball" by HBCU Gameday. In his sophomore season, he averaged 22 points, 7.2 rebounds and 1.5 blocks per game and shot 57.4 percent from the field, earning First Team All-Big South honors. Stanley ranked ninth in the NCAA Division I in scoring. On July 7, 2020, he entered the NCAA transfer portal. He also declared for the 2020 NBA draft before withdrawing.

Xavier
On July 29, 2020, Stanley announced that he would continue his college career at Xavier, choosing the Musketeers over offers from Dayton and Oregon, among others. He filed a waiver for immediate eligibility.

Career statistics

College

|-
| style="text-align:left;"| 2017–18
| style="text-align:left;"| Hampton
| style="text-align:center;" colspan="11"|  Redshirt
|-
| style="text-align:left;"| 2018–19
| style="text-align:left;"| Hampton
| 33 || 2 || 10.5 || .590 || .500 || .591 || 2.9 || .1 || .1 || .5 || 4.4
|-
| style="text-align:left;"| 2019–20
| style="text-align:left;"| Hampton
| 34 || 33 || 35.1 || .574 || .333 || .643 || 7.2 || .7 || .4 || 1.5 || 22.0
|-
| style="text-align:left;"| 2020–21
| style="text-align:left;"| Xavier
| 4 || 0 || 9.5 || .500 || .000 || .667 || 1.8 || .3 || .0 || .3 || 6.0
|- class="sortbottom"
| style="text-align:center;" colspan="2"| Career
| 71 || 35 || 22.2 || .574 || .327 || .635 || 4.9 || .4 || .3 || .9 || 12.9

Personal life
Stanley comes from a religious family and credits God for working behind the scenes on his behalf.

References

External links
Xavier Musketeers bio
Hampton Pirates bio

1998 births
Living people
American men's basketball players
Hampton Pirates men's basketball players
Small forwards
Power forwards (basketball)
Basketball players from Syracuse, New York
Basketball players from Baltimore